East Dennis is a census-designated place (CDP) in the town of Dennis in Barnstable County, Massachusetts, United States. The population was 2,753 at the 2010 census.

Geography
East Dennis is located in the northeast part of the town of Dennis at  (41.740226, -70.157104). Directly to the west is the Dennis census-designated place, also known as "North Dennis". It includes Sea Street Beach, Cold Storage Beach, and Crowes Pasture Beach on the bayside.

Demographics

As of the census of 2000, there were 3,299 people, 1,516 households, and 1,027 families residing in the CDP. The population density was 265.4/km2 (687.8/mi2). There were 2,203 housing units at an average density of 177.2/km2 (459.3/mi2). The racial makeup of the CDP was 97.09% White, 0.79% African American, 0.21% Native American, 0.33% Asian, 0.73% from other races, and 0.85% from two or more races. Hispanic or Latino of any race were 1.67% of the population.

There were 1,516 households, out of which 16.8% had children under the age of 18 living with them, 58.6% were married couples living together, 7.6% had a female householder with no husband present, and 32.2% were non-families. 28.8% of all households were made up of individuals, and 18.5% had someone living alone who was 65 years of age or older. The average household size was 2.17 and the average family size was 2.62.

In the CDP, the population was spread out, with 15.7% under the age of 18, 3.5% from 18 to 24, 17.2% from 25 to 44, 29.4% from 45 to 64, and 34.3% who were 65 years of age or older. The median age was 55 years. For every 100 females, there were 84.4 males. For every 100 females age 18 and over, there were 83.3 males.

The median income for a household in the CDP was $47,857, and the median income for a family was $57,177. Males had a median income of $46,627 versus $30,230 for females. The per capita income for the CDP was $27,466. About 5.6% of families and 7.7% of the population were below the poverty line, including 18.2% of those under age 18 and 1.9% of those age 65 or over.

Notable residents
Notable current and former residents of East Dennis include:
 Scott Corbett (1913-2006), author of 69 children's books and six novels including We Chose Cape Cod (1953) describing East Dennis in fascinating detail
 Edward Gelsthorpe (1923–2009), marketing executive called "Cranapple Ed" for his best-known product launch
 Anna Howard Shaw (1847-1919), first American woman ordained Methodist Protestant minister
 Gertrude Lawrence (1898-1952), British star of stage musicals and comedies, had a summer home in East Dennis from 1940.

References

External links
 Jacob Sears Memorial Library

Census-designated places in Barnstable County, Massachusetts
Census-designated places in Massachusetts
Dennis, Massachusetts
Populated coastal places in Massachusetts